These are the results of the athletics competition at the 2005 Bolivarian Games which took place between August 18 and August 21, 2005, in Armenia, Colombia. The results were assembled from various sources.

Men's results

100 meters
Final – 19 August – Wind: -0.4 m/s

200 meters
Final – 20 August – Wind: +0.4 m/s

400 meters
Final – 19 August

800 meters
Final – 20 August

1500 meters
Final – 19 August

5000 meters
Final – 18 August

10,000 meters
Final – 21 August

Half marathon
Final – 21 August

3000 meters steeplechase
Final – 20 August

110 meters hurdles
Final – 19 August – Wind: -0.1 m/s

400 meters hurdles
Final – 20 August

High jump
Final – 20 August

Pole vault
Final – 20 August

Long jump
Final – 18 August

Triple jump
Final – 19 August

Shot put

Discus throw

*:only two medals per event per country

Hammer throw

Javelin throw

Decathlon
Final – 20 August

20 kilometers walk
Final – 19 August

50 kilometers walk
Final – 21 August

4 x 100 meters relay
Final – 20 August

4 x 400 meters relay
Final – 21 August

Women's results

100 meters

Heat 1 – 19 August – Wind: -0.5 m/s

Heat 2 – 19 August – Wind: +1.4 m/s

Final – 19 August – Wind: +1.6 m/s

*:only two medals per event per country

200 meters
Final – 20 August – Wind: +0.7 m/s

*:only two medals per event per country

400 meters
Final – 19 August

800 meters
Final – 20 August

1500 meters
Final – 19 August

5000 meters
Final – 21 August

10,000 meters
Final – 18 August

Half marathon
Final – 21 August

3000 meters steeplechase
Final – 20 August

100 meters hurdles
Final – 19 August – Wind: -1.2 m/s

400 meters hurdles
Final – 20 August

High jump
Final – 18 August

Pole vault
Final – 19 August

Long jump
Final – 20 August

*:only two medals per event per country

Triple jump
Final – 21 August

Shot put

Discus throw

Hammer throw

Javelin throw

Heptathlon
Final – 20 August

20 kilometers walk
Final – 21 August

4 x 100 meters relay
Final – 20 August

4 x 400 meters relay
Final – 21 August

References

Bolivarian Games
2005